Iodotrifluoroethylene is the organofluorine compound with the formula . It is a volatile colorless liquid.

Preparation and reactions
It is prepared by iodination of trifluorovinyl lithium.

Iodotrifluoroethylene reacts with cadmium metal to give CdC2F3(I).

It reacts with nitric oxide under UV light, producing a nitroso compound, with iodine as a byproduct:
2  + 2 NO → 2  +

References

Organofluorides
Organoiodides
Haloalkenes